Paromelix unicolor is a species of beetle in the family Cerambycidae, and the only species in the genus Paromelix. It was described by Quedenfeldt in 1883.

References

Phrynetini
Beetles described in 1883